Luciana Geuna (August 10, 1977) is an Argentine journalist. She hosts the news program Telenoche.

Geuna was born in Rosario, Santa Fe.

Awards

Nominations
 2013 Martín Fierro Awards
 Best female journalist

References

1977 births
Argentine women journalists
People from Rosario, Santa Fe
Living people